XHOQ-FM is a radio station on 100.1 FM in Oaxaca, Oaxaca, Mexico. It is owned by Radiorama and carries its La Poderosa grupera format.

History
XHOQ received its concession on November 28, 1988. Until 2014, it was owned by Promociones Radiofónicas Culturales, S.A.

References

Radio stations in Oaxaca City